Rue Morgue may refer to:

"The Murders in the Rue Morgue", a short story by Edgar Allan Poe
Murders in the Rue Morgue (1932 film), a 1932 film based on the story
Murders in the Rue Morgue (1971 film), a 1971 film
"Murders in the Rue Morgue", a song from 1981 Iron Maiden album Killers
Rue Morgue (magazine), a horror magazine
Rue Morgue Radio, a radio offshoot of the magazine
Rue Morgue Festival of Fear, a Canadian horror convention